Shin Min Daily News is a Singapore Chinese-language afternoon newspaper currently published by SPH Media Trust. First started on 18 March 1967, by Singapore businessman Liang Runzhi (梁潤之) and the renowned Hong Kong writer Louis Cha as an offshoot of Hong Kong's Ming Pao, it featured exclusive serializations of some of Cha's wuxia novels in its early days.  In the early 1980s, Cha sold his shares in the paper after the Singapore government ruled that foreigners could only hold up to 3% of shares in locally based papers.

Shin Min is a tabloid-style paper focusing on entertainment and local news with sensationalised headlines, although it is printed on broadsheets.  Its main competitor was Lianhe Wanbao, which was also published by the SPH. Wanbao ceased publication on 24 December 2021 and merged into Shin Min.

Shin Min was also published in Malaysia until 1994, and it was the first Chinese language newspaper to be published in tabloid.

References

External links
 https://www.shinmin.sg/
Shin Min Blog
Omy Shin Min News Source
Shin Min Daily News Facebook

See also
List of newspapers in Singapore
List of newspapers

1967 establishments in Singapore
Newspapers published in Singapore
SPH Media Trust
Chinese-language newspapers (Simplified Chinese)
Chinese-Singaporean culture
Newspapers established in 1967